Volcano is the second solo album (fourth album overall) by American singer-songwriter Edie Brickell, released in 2003. The album sold about 21,000 copies as of November 2003.

Track listing

Personnel 
 Edie Brickell – vocals, guitars (1-9), acoustic guitar (10), backing vocals (12, 13)
 Carter Albrecht – acoustic piano (1, 4, 6, 9, 10, 11), keyboards (2), vibraphone (4), clarinet (5, 12)
 Charlie Sexton – guitars (1-7, 9, 11, 12), backing vocals (4, 11, 12), Mellotron (6), cello (6), viola (6), violin (6), keyboards (7), percussion (9), acoustic guitar (10), electric guitar (10), gut-string guitar (10), lap steel guitar (13)
 Andy Fairweather-Low – electric guitar (10), high-string  acoustic guitar (10)
 Pino Palladino – bass (1-5, 7, 9, 10, 12)
 Tony Garnier – bass (6, 11), electric upright bass (13)
 Steve Gadd – drums (1-5, 7, 9, 10, 12), percussion (1, 5, 9)
 George Recile – drums (6, 11)

Production 
 Charlie Sexton – producer  
 Andy Smith – recording, mixing 
 Dan Bucchi – assistant engineer 
 Suzanne Kapa – assistant engineer 
 Claudius Mittendorfer – assistant engineer 
 Scott Hull – mastering 
 Eloise Bryan – A&R 
 Jolene Cherry – A&R
 Nina Freeman – A&R
 Meg Hansen – A&R,  production coordinator
 Chris Testa – drum technician
 Yuek Wong – guitar technician
 Cindy Osborne – project coordinator 
 Jill Dell'Abate – production coordinator
 Sandy Brummels – art direction
 Chris Kornmann – design 
 Danny Clinch – photography 
 Lulu McGillicutty – drawing
 Mr. Big Stuff – drawing

Charts
Album – Billboard (North America)

References

Edie Brickell albums
2003 albums